Differentiation is a peer-reviewed academic journal covering cell differentiation and cell development. It was established in 1973 and is published 10 times per year by Elsevier, on behalf of the International Society of Differentiation. The editor-in-chief is Colin Stewart (Agency for Science, Technology and Research). According to the Journal Citation Reports, the journal has a 2016 impact factor of 2.567.

References

External links 
 
 International Society of Differentiation

Molecular and cellular biology journals
Developmental biology journals
Publications established in 1973
Elsevier academic journals
English-language journals